State Highway 149 (SH 149) is a  state highway in southwestern Colorado, United States. SH 149's southern terminus is at U.S. Highway 160 (US 160) in South Fork, and the northern terminus is at US 50 west of Gunnison.  The entire route is also known as the Silver Thread Scenic and Historic Byway.

Route description

SH 149 begins in the south at its junction with US 160 at South Fork. From there the road winds its way generally northward through the San Juan Mountains. The first portion of the road parallels the upper Rio Grande as it passes through Rio Grande National Forest. SH 149 winds through the mountains for  before coming to the historic mining town of Creede. At this point the road passes into Gunnison National Forest and, after a brief descent, begins an even higher climb to Slumgullion Pass elevated . From there, the highway descends and crosses the Slumgullion Earthflow before it drops to the town of Lake City, where it begins to parallel Lake Fork, a tributary of the Gunnison River. SH 149 follows Lake Fork down out of the mountains and eventually turns away to the east passing just north of Powderhorn where the road again turns northward. After skirting the southern edge of Curecanti National Recreation Area, the highway crosses the Gunnison River and finally reaches its northern terminus at US 50 approximately nine miles west of Gunnison. There are no major junctions along its entire length.

History
The route was established in the 1920s and was completely paved by 1977.

Major intersections

References

External links

149
Transportation in Rio Grande County, Colorado
Transportation in Mineral County, Colorado
Transportation in Hinsdale County, Colorado
Transportation in Gunnison County, Colorado